In mathematics, Fuglede's theorem is a result in operator theory, named after Bent Fuglede.

The result 

Theorem (Fuglede) Let T and N be bounded operators on a complex Hilbert space with N being normal. If TN = NT, then TN* = N*T, where N* denotes the adjoint of N.

Normality of N is necessary, as is seen by taking T=N. When T is self-adjoint, the claim is trivial regardless of whether N is normal:

Tentative Proof: If the underlying Hilbert space is finite-dimensional, the spectral theorem says that N is of the form

where Pi are pairwise orthogonal projections. One expects that TN = NT if and only if TPi = PiT.
Indeed it can be proved to be true by elementary arguments (e.g. it can be shown that all Pi are representable as polynomials of N and for this reason, if T commutes with N, it has to commute with Pi...).
Therefore T must also commute with

In general, when the Hilbert space is not finite-dimensional, the normal operator N gives rise to a projection-valued measure P on its spectrum, σ(N), which assigns a projection PΩ to each Borel subset of σ(N). N can be expressed as

Differently from the finite dimensional case, it is by no means obvious that TN = NT implies TPΩ = PΩT. Thus, it is not so obvious that T also commutes with any simple function of the form

That is the relevance of Fuglede's theorem: The latter hypothesis is not really necessary.

Putnam's generalization 
The following contains Fuglede's result as a special case. The proof by Rosenblum pictured below is just that presented by Fuglede for his theorem when assuming N=M.

Theorem (Calvin Richard Putnam) Let T, M, N be linear operators on a complex Hilbert space, and suppose that M and N are normal, T is bounded and MT = TN.
Then M*T = TN*.

First proof (Marvin Rosenblum):
By induction, the hypothesis implies that MkT = TNk for all k.

Consider the function

This is equal to

where  because  is normal, and similarly . However we have

so U is unitary, and hence has norm 1 for all λ; the same is true for V(λ), so

So F is a bounded analytic vector-valued function, and is thus constant, and equal to F(0) = T. Considering the first-order terms in the expansion for small λ, we must have M*T = TN*.

The original paper of Fuglede appeared in 1950; it was extended to the form given above by Putnam in 1951. The short proof given above was first published by Rosenblum in 1958; it is very elegant, but is less general than the original proof which also considered the case of unbounded operators. Another simple proof of Putnam's theorem is as follows:

Second proof: Consider the matrices

The operator N'  is normal and, by assumption, T' N' = N' T' . By Fuglede's theorem, one has

Comparing entries then gives the desired result.

From Putnam's generalization, one can deduce the following:

Corollary If two normal operators M and N are similar, then they are unitarily equivalent.

Proof: Suppose MS = SN where S is a bounded invertible operator. Putnam's result implies M*S = SN*, i.e.

Take the adjoint of the above equation and we have

So

Let S*=VR, with V a unitary (since S is invertible) and R the positive square root of SS*. As R is a limit of polynomials on SS*, the above implies that R commutes with M. It is also invertible. Then

Corollary If M and N are normal operators, and MN = NM, then MN is also normal.

Proof: The argument invokes only Fuglede's theorem. One can directly compute

By Fuglede, the above becomes

But M and N are normal, so

C*-algebras 
The theorem can be rephrased as a statement about elements of C*-algebras.

Theorem (Fuglede-Putnam-Rosenblum) Let x, y be two normal elements of a C*-algebra A and z such that xz = zy. Then it follows that x* z = z y*.

References 

 Fuglede, Bent. A Commutativity Theorem for Normal Operators — PNAS
 .
  

Operator theory
Theorems in functional analysis